The Permanent Representative of the Russian Federation to the United Nations is the leader of Russia's diplomatic mission to the United Nations.
Vasily Nebenzya is charged with representing Russia in the United Nations Security Council and the formal meetings of the United Nations General Assembly except the rare occasion when the most senior officials of Russia are present (such as the President of Russia or the Minister of Foreign Affairs). The ambassador must be nominated by the President and confirmed by the Federation Council.

The position of Russian/Soviet Permanent Representative to the United Nations is the highest position among all the Russian ambassadors. They serve in various organizations and countries at the pleasure of the president.

Vasily Nebenzya was nominated to the position by President Vladimir Putin and was confirmed by the Federation Council. He has been serving since July 27, 2017.

Permanent Representatives of the Soviet Union to the United Nations

Permanent Representatives of the Russian Federation to the United Nations

See also 
 The Permanent Mission of the Russian Federation to the United Nations in New York

References

External links 
  Permanent Representative of Russia to the United Nations

 
United Nations
Russia
Main
Russia and the United Nations